Haji Piyada Mosque  or Noh Gonbad Mosque ( "Mosque of Nine Cupolas"), a Samanid-style building in Balkh province of northern Afghanistan. Built in the 9th century, it is thought to be the earliest Islamic building in the country. Carbon dating conducted in early 2017, together with historical sources, suggest it could have been built as early as the year 794. It was built on the remains of a Buddhist monastery.

The site was listed on the World Monuments Fund's 2006 World Monuments Watch list of 100 Most Endangered Sites.

Description 
The tomb measures 20×20 meters. The outside walls are of mud-brick construction. The interior is divided into nine bays, each originally covered by a dome. The columns and the arches that divide the bays are decorated in deeply carved stucco, depicting a wide variety of designs, stylistically comparable to Abbasid decoration in Mesopotamia.

Pilgrims visit the tomb of saint, Haji Piyada, who was also buried there.

The reconstruction of site
The site collapsed and damaged gradually due to aging structure and natural disasters like earthquake. As in the earlier structure, out of 9 domes, only 4 remain with interconnect arches. The front feature of arches, partially damaged. Later it has been reconstructed. 
In 2006, based on a request from Afghan authorities, UNESCO, and DAFA, French Archaeological Delegation in Afghanistan, a team of experts and the representative of Aga Khan Trust for Culture, visited this place. In 2009, the conservation of the site has started according to the request of Aga Khan Trust for Culture and funded by US Embassy in Kabul, Afghanistan. During reconstruction, there were several historian scholars from University of Florence in Italy, to coordinate the reconstruction team for the betterment of process. The first phase of work has been done in 2011. Within the project, a larger temporary metal roof was constructed in order to protect the site from rain, wind and other natural disasters.

Gallery

References

Archaeological sites in Afghanistan
Islamic architecture
Mosques in Afghanistan
Buildings and structures in Balkh Province
Balkh